Raimundo Morales Veloso (2 October 1898 – 4 October 1986) was a Spanish tennis player. He competed in the men's singles event at the 1924 Summer Olympics.

References

External links
 

1898 births
1986 deaths
Spanish male tennis players
Olympic tennis players of Spain
Tennis players at the 1924 Summer Olympics
Tennis players from Barcelona